River Tillard is a community in the Canadian province of Nova Scotia, located  in Richmond County.

References
River Tillard entry in Nova Scotia Geographical Names (Department of Service Nova Scotia & Municipal Relations)

Communities in Richmond County, Nova Scotia
General Service Areas in Nova Scotia